Contarinia verrucicola, known generally as the linden wart gall midge, is a species of gall midges in the family Cecidomyiidae.

References

Further reading

 Diptera.info
 

Cecidomyiinae
Insects described in 1875
Gall-inducing insects